Aechmea pineliana is a flowering plant in the family Bromeliaceae. It is typical of Atlantic Forest vegetation in Brazil, specially in following states: Espírito Santo, Minas Gerais, and Rio de Janeiro. This plant is cited in Flora Brasiliensis by Carl Friedrich Philipp von Martius, and it is often used as an ornamental plant.

References

External links
   Flora Brasiliensis Aechmea pineliana

pineliana
Flora of Brazil
Plants described in 1858
Taxa named by Adolphe-Théodore Brongniart
Taxa named by Jules Émile Planchon
Taxa named by John Gilbert Baker